Fabrizio Borellini (born 5 July 1968) is a retired Italian high jumper.

He won one medal at the International athletics competitions.

Biography
World Junior Championships Athens 1986 finished thirteenth place 

European Junior Championships Birmingham 1987 finished in seventh place

He finished fourth at the 1988 European Indoor Championships  with the Italian record  absolute Indoor meters 2,30 

1988 Summer Olympics in Seoul fourteenth place 

Italian Record Outdoor Under 23 1988  

Bronze medal at the 1991 Mediterranean Games.

World Championships Tokyo 1991 eighth place

He became Italian high jump champion in 1987 - 1991, and indoor champion in 1987 - 1994 - 1998 

His personal best jump is achieved in May 1988 in Rome. He had  on the indoor track, achieved at the 1988 European Indoor Championships in Budapest.

Achievements

National titles
Fabrizio Borellini has won 5’'' times the individual national championship.2 win in High jump (1987) (1991)3 wins''' in High jump indoor (1987) (1994) (1998)

See also
Italian all-time top lists - High jump

References

External links
 

1968 births
Living people
Italian male high jumpers
Mediterranean Games bronze medalists for Italy
Athletes (track and field) at the 1991 Mediterranean Games
Mediterranean Games medalists in athletics